Sadahzinia (born Yolanda Tsiampokalou; ; 1977) is a Greek rapper, regarded by many as the first woman to enter the hip-hop scene in Greece. Her name is a play on the words: "sad" + "Jah" + the flower "Zinnia".

Discography

1998 - Allo ena psema
2000 - Asimenia akri
2002 - Sto xroma tis staxtis
2003 - I voui kai ta kamomata
2005 - Mixtape (97'-04')
2006 - Petranasa
2010 - Sarma
2016 - Karpimo (Κάρπιμο)

References

External links 
Low Bap Foundation

Greek women rappers
1977 births
Living people
Musicians from Piraeus